Zakroczym Land (Polish: ziemia zakroczymska), named after the town of Zakroczym), was an administrative unit (ziemia) of the Duchy of Mazovia, Kingdom of Poland and the Polish–Lithuanian Commonwealth. It was part of Masovian Voivodeship, and its history dates back to the late Middle Ages, when Zakroczym became seat of a castellan. Local sejmiks took place in Zakroczym. 

Total area of the Land of Zakroczym was 1155 square kilometers. Located in central Mazovia, it was divided into three counties: Zakroczym, Serock, and Nowe Miasto. All three towns had royal status, and were seats of castellans. The biggest city of Zakroczym Land however was Pultusk, with its residence of the Bishops of Plock and Jesuit College.

Sources 
 Adolf Pawiński: Polska XVI wieku pod względem geograficzno-statystycznym. T. 5: Mazowsze. Warszawa: Księgarnia Gebethnera i Wolffa, 1895

Ziemias